MW 18014 was a German A-4 test rocket launched on 20 June 1944, at the Peenemünde Army Research Center in Peenemünde. It was a vertical test launch, and was not intended to reach orbital velocity, so it returned and impacted Earth, making it the first sub-orbital spaceflight.

Background 

Early A-4 rockets, despite being able to reach altitudes of 90 km, had suffered from multiple reliability issues. For example, a design fault in the forward part of the outer hull caused it to regularly fail mid-flight, resulting in the failure of up to 70% of test launches. On one occasion, an A-4 rocket suffering from pogo oscillations during ascent veered 90 degrees off course then spiralled back down to its launch pit, killing four launch troops on site.

The Peenemünde rocket team made a number of improvements to rectify the reliability issues during 1943 and the first half of 1944. Hindering the program were constant interference from the SS, Allied raids as part of Operation Hydra, attempts to privatise the program in June 1944, and a two-week detention of technical director Wernher von Braun on 15 March 1944.

Allied advances in Northern France and improvements to the Mittelwerk underground facility, where the A-4 rockets were produced, and improvements to the liquid propellant formula placed renewed emphasis on Von Braun to address the A-4's reliability issues.

Records broken 
MW 18014 was part of a series of vertical test launches made in June 1944 designed to gauge the rocket's behaviour in vacuum. MW 18014 broke the altitude record set by one of its predecessors (launched on 3 October 1942) to attain an apogee of 176 km.

MW 18014 was the first man-made object to cross into outer space, as defined by the 100 km Kármán line. This particular altitude was not considered significant at the time; the Peenemünde rocket scientists rather celebrated test launch V-4  in October 1942, first to reach the thermosphere. After the war, the World Air Sports Federation (FAI) defined the boundary between Earth's atmosphere and outer space to be the Kármán line.

A subsequent A-4/V-2 launched as part of the same series of tests would break MW 18014's record, with an apogee of 189 km. The date of that launch is unknown because rocket scientists did not record precise dates during this phase.

Notes

See also
 Sputnik 1, first orbital space flight, 4 October 1957
 Albert II, first mammal in space, 14 June 1949
 Vostok 1, first manned space flight, 12 April 1961

References

Spacecraft launched in 1944
1944 in Germany
V-weapons
Wernher von Braun
Space programme of Germany
Short-range ballistic missiles
Spaceflight before 1951